Keep Your Wig On is the fourth studio album released by the rock band Fastball. It was released by the indie label Rykodisc and the record was mixed by Bob Clearmountain. Adam Schlesinger produced Someday and Red Light during the band's New York recording sessions.

Track listing

 The European version of Keep Your Wig On has a bonus track, "High Low".

Personnel
Fastball
 Tony Scalzo  - vocals, bass guitar, keyboards, guitar
 Miles Zuniga - vocals, guitar
 Joey Shuffield  - drums, percussion

Guest musicians
 Jeff Groves - saxophone, backing vocals 
 Kevin McKinney - bass guitar
 Mike McCarthy - tambourine
 Rob Seidenberg - bass guitar, guitar
 Dan McLoughlin - acoustic guitar
 Julian Raymond - backing vocals
 Brannen Temple - drums
 Alexandria Jackson - backing vocals
 Jennifer Hirsh - backing vocals
 Matt Hubbard - harmonica
 Jeff Trott - drum loops, bass guitar, guitar, backing vocals
 Kevin Lovejoy - keyboards, piano
 Louis Jay Myers - pedal steel guitar

References

2004 albums
Fastball (band) albums
Rykodisc albums